Mieke is a feminine given name and nickname of Dutch origin. Notable people with the given name include:

Given name
 Mieke de Boer (born 1980), Dutch darts player
 Mieke Eerkens, Dutch-American writer
 Mieke Offeciers (born 1952), Belgian businesswoman and former Belgian government minister
 Mieke Pullen (1957–2003), Dutch long-distance runner
 Mieke Sterk (born 1946) Dutch track and field athlete and politician
 Mieke Suys (born 1968), Belgian athlete
 Mieke Wijaya (born 1940), Indonesian actress

Nickname
 Mieke Andela-Baur (1923–2016), Dutch politician
 Mieke Bal (born 1946), Dutch cultural theorist and video artist
 Mieke Buchan, Australian television and radio presenter
 Mieke Cabout (born 1986), Dutch water polo player
 Mieke Jaapies (born 1943), Dutch sprint canoer
 Mieke Vogels (born 1954), Flemish politician

See also
 Maria (given name)
 Mieke (disambiguation)

Dutch feminine given names
Lists of people by nickname